Ryan Patrick Mulhern (born January 11, 1973) is an American former ice hockey player.

Biography
Mulhern grew up in Havertown, Pennsylvania
As a youth, he played in the 1985 and 1986 Quebec International Pee-Wee Hockey Tournaments with the Philadelphia Flyers minor ice hockey team.

Mulhern was named to the All-ECAC Hockey rookie team in the 1992–93 season. He was selected by the Calgary Flames in the 1992 NHL Entry Draft, and played briefly for the Washington Capitals.

References

External links

1973 births
Living people
American men's ice hockey right wingers
Brown Bears men's ice hockey players
Calgary Flames draft picks
Ice hockey players from Pennsylvania
Kansas City Blades players
Las Vegas Thunder players
New Jersey Rockin' Rollers players
People from Haverford Township, Pennsylvania
Portland Pirates players
Washington Capitals players